Caroline Adderson (born September 9, 1963) is a Canadian novelist and short story writer. She has published four novels, two short story collections and two books for young readers.

Personal life and career
Caroline Adderson was born on September 9, 1963 in Edmonton, Alberta. She studied at the University of British Columbia, receiving a degree in education in 1982.

Her first short story collection, Bad Imaginings (1993), was nominated for the Governor General's Award and won the Ethel Wilson Fiction Prize. Her second novel, Sitting Practice (2003), also won the award. Adderson has won the CBC Literary Competition three times. In 2006, she received the Marian Engel Award, given annually to an outstanding Canadian female writer in mid-career in recognition of her body of work.

Awards and honours
1993 – Nominee, Governor General's Award, for Bad Imaginings
1994 – Ethel Wilson Fiction Prize, for Bad Imaginings
1999 – Shortlisted, Rogers Writers' Trust Fiction Prize, for A History of Forgetting
2000 – Shortlisted, Ethel Wilson Prize, for A History I of Forgetting
2003 – Ethel Wilson Fiction Prize, for Sitting Practice
2006 – Marian Engel Award
2006 – Longlisted, Scotiabank Giller Prize for the short story collection Pleased to Meet You

Bibliography

Short stories 
 Bad Imaginings (1993) 
 Pleased to Meet You (2006) (longlisted for the Giller Prize)

Novels 
 A History of Forgetting (1999)
 Sitting Practice (2003) 
 The Sky is Falling (2010) Thomas Allen Publishers
 Ellen in Pieces  (2014)

Novella 
 Mr. Justice (2005)

Children's fiction
Very Serious Children (2007)
I, Bruno (2007)
Bruno for Real (2008)
Jasper John Dooley: Star of the Week (2012)
Middle of Nowhere (2012)
Jasper John Dooley: Left Behind  (2013)
Jasper John Dooley: Not in Love (2014)

References

Sources
 W. H. New, ed. Encyclopedia of Literature in Canada. Toronto: University of Toronto Press, 2002: 9.
 Records of Caroline Adderson are held by Simon Fraser University's Special Collections and Rare Books
 Adderson at Writers' Union of Canada: CV, Publications, Awards

1963 births
Living people
20th-century Canadian novelists
21st-century Canadian novelists
Canadian women short story writers
Canadian women novelists
Writers from Edmonton
20th-century Canadian women writers
21st-century Canadian women writers
20th-century Canadian short story writers
21st-century Canadian short story writers